Betty Sims (December 15, 1935 - August 22, 2016) was an American Republican politician in the Missouri General Assembly who served in the Missouri Senate from 1995 until 2002.

Born in St. Louis, Missouri, Sims attended Smith College and Washington University obtaining a bachelor's degree in 1956 and obtaining a Master of Business Administration from Southern Illinois University.  She worked as a business consultant.

References

1935 births
2016 deaths
20th-century American politicians
21st-century American politicians
20th-century American women politicians
21st-century American women politicians
Republican Party Missouri state senators
Politicians from St. Louis
Women state legislators in Missouri